PPMG "Exarch Antim I" is a public high school in Vidin, Bulgaria. The school specializes in maths and science. It is attended by students from the fifth to the twelfth grade.

Building
The school building was built in 1891 with donations provided by the Exarch Antim I.

See also
Education in Bulgaria

External links
 http://pmg-vd.org/ 

Schools in Bulgaria
Buildings and structures in Vidin